Philander Stephens (1788 – July 8, 1842) was a Jacksonian member of the U.S. House of Representatives from Pennsylvania.

Philander Stephens was born near Montrose, Pennsylvania.  He served as coroner in 1815, county commissioner in 1818 and sheriff in 1821.  He was a member of the Pennsylvania House of Representatives in 1824 and 1825.

Stephens was elected as a Jacksonian to the Twenty-first and Twenty-second Congresses.  He served as chairman of the United States House Committee on Expenditures in the Department of the Treasury during the Twenty-second Congress.  He was not a candidate for renomination in 1832.  He resumed agricultural and mercantile pursuits and died probably in Springville Township, Pennsylvania.  Interment in Stephens Burying Ground in Dimock Township, Pennsylvania.

Sources

The Political Graveyard

Members of the Pennsylvania House of Representatives
American coroners
Pennsylvania sheriffs
1788 births
1842 deaths
Jacksonian members of the United States House of Representatives from Pennsylvania
People from Montrose, Pennsylvania
19th-century American politicians